Salix uralicola is a willow species described by I. V. Belyaeva. No subspecies are listed in the Catalog of Life.

Range
It is found in Western Siberia and northern European Russia.

References

uralicola
Flora of Russia